Captain Amarinder Singh's first cabinet started from February 2002. Amarinder Singh is the leader of INC was sworn in the Chief Ministers of Punjab in 2002. The following is the list of ministers with their portfolios in the Government of Punjab

Council of Ministers

References

Amarinder 01
2002 in India
2002 in Indian politics
Amarinder 01
India Amarinder 01
2002 establishments in Punjab, India